Daviesia emarginata is a species of flowering plant in the family Fabaceae and is endemic to the south-west of Western Australia. It is an erect, mostly glabrous shrub with scattered egg-shaped phyllodes with the narrower end towards the base and with a notch at the tip, and yellow and pink flowers.

Description

Taxonomy and naming
This pea was first formally described in 1845 by Friedrich Anton Wilhelm Miquel who gave it the name Fusanus emarginatus in Johann Georg Christian Lehmann's Plantae Preissianae from specimens collected near Plantagenet in 1840. In 1995, Michael Crisp changed the name to Daviesia emarginata in the journal Phytotaxa. The specific epithet (emarginata) means "notched", referring to the phyllodes.

Distribution and habitat
Daviesia emarginata grows on sandplains in mallee-heathland in near coastal areas between Albany, Ravensthorpe and inland to the Stirling Range in the Avon Wheatbelt, Esperance Plains, Jarrah Forest and Mallee biogeographic regions of south-western Western Australia.

Conservation status
Daviesia emarginata is classified as "not threatened" by the Western Australian Government Department of Biodiversity, Conservation and Attractions.

References

emarginata
Eudicots of Western Australia
Plants described in 1845
Taxa named by Friedrich Anton Wilhelm Miquel